Anundsjö IF is a Swedish football club located in Bredbyn outside Örnsköldsvik. The club, formed in 1921, is currently playing in the fourth highest Swedish league, Division 2. The club is affiliated to the Ångermanlands Fotbollförbund.

Season to season

Attendances

In recent seasons Anundsjö IF have had the following average attendances:

External links
 Anundsjö IF – official site

Footnotes

Football clubs in Västernorrland County
Association football clubs established in 1921
1921 establishments in Sweden